Beginning in the 1970 NFL season, the National Football League began scheduling a weekly regular season game on Monday night before a national television audience. From 1970 to 2005, the ABC television network carried these games, with the ESPN cable television network taking over beginning in September 2006. Listed below are games played from 2010 to the most recent season.

Stadiums appearing under different names
Some stadiums and teams had multiple names throughout their appearances in the MNF package in this era. All names listed were seen in the package at least once in this era.

First name listed is the current (or final if it does not exist anymore) name for each team and stadium.
MetLife Stadium – New Meadowlands Stadium
Mercedes-Benz Superdome – Louisiana Superdome
AT&T Stadium – Cowboys Stadium
NRG Stadium – Reliant Stadium
Nissan Stadium – LP Field
Hard Rock Stadium – Sun Life Stadium
Acrisure Stadium – Heinz Field

Team(s) under new names:
Los Angeles Rams – St. Louis Rams
Los Angeles Chargers – San Diego Chargers
Las Vegas Raiders – Oakland Raiders
Washington Commanders – Washington Redskins (through 2019 season), Washington Football Team (2020 and 2021 seasons)

2010s

2010 NFL season
The 59 points scored by the Philadelphia Eagles against the Washington Redskins on November 15 are the most ever by one team on Monday Night Football.

The December 20 game between the Chicago Bears and Minnesota Vikings was played at TCF Bank Stadium due to the roof failure at the Metrodome eight days earlier.

The latter half of the season opening doubleheader featured the first game to not be hosted by a team in the Pacific time Zone with the Kansas City Chiefs hosting the San Diego Chargers.

2011 NFL season
Late in the New England Patriots–Miami Dolphins season opener, Ron Jaworski inadvertently uttered a profanity, for which he apologized later in the broadcast; whether or not it was related, it would eventually be Jaworski's final season in the MNF booth.

The September 26 game between the Washington Redskins and Dallas Cowboys was the final appearance (until 2017) of Hank Williams, Jr.'s intro song "All My Rowdy Friends are Back for Monday Night (Are You Ready For Some Football)", as he would get fired from ESPN during Week 4 for comments about Adolf Hitler.

The December 19 game between the Pittsburgh Steelers and San Francisco 49ers was delayed twice due to power outages, one taking place before the kickoff and another during the 2nd quarter; during which the 49ers led, 6–0.

2012 NFL season
The NFL locked out its officials in June. As a result, the first three weeks of the season were played with replacement officials. The lack of regular officials came to a head in the Week 3 Monday night game between the Green Bay Packers and Seattle Seahawks. The game was a defensive affair as the Packers led 12–7 in the closing moments of the game. On the final play, Seahawks quarterback Russell Wilson threw a Hail Mary pass toward the end zone. Seahawks wide receiver Golden Tate and Packers defender M. D. Jennings each grabbed hold of the ball. In the process, one official signaled touchdown while another signaled touchback. Simultaneous possession was the final ruling which gave Seattle the touchdown and the win. However, the nearby officials missed Tate pushing Packers cornerback Sam Shields with both hands and causing a pass interference penalty in the process. The game's aftermath included major discussion and focus on the play forcing the NFL to reach a settlement with the regular officials. The loss also hurt the Packers in the playoff race as the team finished 11–5 behind the 11–4–1 San Francisco 49ers. The loss mattered as Green Bay had to travel to San Francisco in the Divisional Round of the playoffs. A win would have assured a first round bye for Green Bay. The game was called the Fail Mary.

Controversy also hit MNF later in the season as the San Diego Chargers were accused of using a banned substance during their October 15 game with the Denver Broncos. It was later revealed to be Gorilla Glue, a legal substance later banned by the NFL.

2013 NFL season
The October 21 game between the Minnesota Vikngs and New York Giants was notable because it featured quarterback Josh Freeman scoring a 40.6 passer rating in the game. He was 20 for 53 passing with 190 yards and the only Vikings score came on a 1st quarter punt return touchdown. In contrast, Eli Manning had a good day for the Giants with a touchdown pass to cap a long 2nd quarter drive.

The December 2 game between the New Orleans Saints and Seattle Seahawks in Seattle was a much hyped game because of the high powered Saints offense led by quarterback Drew Brees was taking the ferocious defense of the Seahawks with the Legion of Boom. The game, however, was a blowout, with the Seahawks winning 34–7.

ESPN employee and former Chicago Bears tight end and head coach Mike Ditka had his number retired at halftime of the December 9 game versus the Dallas Cowboys. Though the game was a blowout in favor of Chicago 45–28, it is more notable for its temperature which was 8 °F and featured a −12 degree wind chill.

The December 23 game between the Atlanta Falcons and the San Francisco 49ers was the last game ever at Candlestick Park.

2014 NFL season
Starting in 2014, the NFL awarded ESPN broadcasting rights to an NFL Wild Card Playoff game. ESPN also obtained rights to the NFL Pro Bowl through the next eight years.

With their September 15 win over the Indianapolis Colts, the Philadelphia Eagles become the first team to start a season 2–0 after trailing 14–0 at halftime of their first two games. In the following week, Philadelphia would become the first team to start 3–0 after trailing more than 10 points in all three games.

The 700th game in Monday Night Football history featured the San Francisco 49ers beating the St. Louis Rams in Week 6.  It was also the last Monday night game played in St. Louis.

2015 NFL season
This was the tenth season of Monday Night Football on ESPN. Also, the NFL Wild Card Playoff game on ESPN was simulcast on ABC, making it the first NFL game to be broadcast by ABC since Super Bowl XL in 2006.

The October 5 game between the Detroit Lions and the Seattle Seahawks featured a controversial call where Lions wide receiver Calvin Johnson fumbled into the end zone and K.J. Wright batted the ball out of the end zone to prevent a Lions player from recovering the ball. This is a penalty by NFL rules, however no flag was thrown.

The November 9 game between the Chicago Bears and the San Diego Chargers was the last Monday night game played in San Diego.

2016 NFL season
The Houston Texans–Oakland Raiders game was played at Estadio Azteca in Mexico City as part of the NFL International Series, the first game in Mexico City since the first ever International Series game in 2005. This was also the first time Monday Night Football featured a game outside the United States. The Wild Card Playoff game was again simulcast on ABC, just like the previous year.

2017 NFL season
In addition to the Wild Card playoff game, the 2018 Pro Bowl was also simulcast on ABC as well. This was the first time since 2014 that the Pro Bowl was aired on broadcast television in any form.

2018 NFL season
Starting in 2018, the NFL moved the start time of Monday Night Football back, from 8:30 p.m. ET to 8:15 p.m. ET.  For the second time in 3 seasons, Monday Night Football was supposed to make a trip to Mexico City, for the Kansas City Chiefs-Los Angeles Rams contest, as part of the NFL International Series, but the NFL deemed field conditions to be poor and moved the game to Los Angeles. This was the first Monday Night game in Los Angeles since 1991, as well as the highest scoring game in MNF history. The Wild Card game and the Pro Bowl were again simulcast on ABC.

2019 NFL season
This season marked the 50th season of Monday Night Football. There was a rematch of the first MNF game, during Week 2, as the new-look Cleveland Browns faced Le'Veon Bell and the New York Jets on September 16. In addition, MNF returned to Mexico City for the first time since 2016, with the Kansas City Chiefs and Los Angeles Chargers renewing a classic AFC West rivalry. Also, the Wild Card Playoff, and the Pro Bowl, both shown on ESPN, were again simulcast on ABC.

2020s

2020 NFL season
The Week 2 game between the New Orleans Saints and Las Vegas Raiders, the first NFL game in Las Vegas, was simulcast on ESPN, ABC, and ESPN2 as part of ESPN's Megacast production. This was the first regular season Monday Night Football game on ABC since the end of the 2005 season. The 2021 Pro Bowl, which was also going to be played in Las Vegas and simulcast on ABC, was canceled due to the COVID-19 pandemic. Instead, ESPN, ABC, and the NFL combined to air a two-hour special, honoring the players selected to the Pro Bowl. 

Following a strong Week 2 simulcast, ABC simulcast the Buffalo Bills-San Francisco 49ers (played in Glendale instead of Santa Clara due to Santa Clara County imposing a ban on professional sports contests in response to COVID-19) and Buffalo Bills-New England Patriots games, and Megacast their Super Wild Card Playoff Game across ESPN, ABC, ESPN Deportes, ESPN2, ESPN+, and Freeform.

2021 NFL season
In the offseason, ESPN and the NFL agreed to a new contract that will see ESPN keep MNF, ABC expand their involvement with more games, including the Super Bowl, and ESPN+ airing an International game, plus rights to stream all MNF games. Along with those perks, ESPN will air a Saturday doubleheader, during the final weekend of the season, with both games having major playoff implications. The games will kick off at 4:15 ET and 8:15 ET. Both games will be simulcast on ABC. Because of this, ESPN dropped the Week 1 doubleheader, in favor of the Week 18 doubleheader. This will be the first time since ABC's last year airing MNF that there would be no Week 1 doubleheader.

As part of a 3-year partnership with Peyton Manning’s new production company, Omaha Productions, ESPN2 and ESPN+ will air 10 editions of a newly-revamped Monday Night Megacast, which will feature Peyton and Eli Manning, along with special guests. The first three games of the season will have the Megacast broadcast, while ESPN will select 7 more games later in the season.

2022 NFL season
This was the 53rd season of Monday Night Football, the 17th in the ESPN era. There was 21 games across ESPN, ABC, and ESPN+ in the 2022 season. 

ESPN+ carried an International Series game on October 30, and ABC  carried an exclusive game on September 19. ABC also simulcasted select games, as well as the Week 18 Saturday Doubleheader, the Monday Night Super Wild Card Game, and the Pro Bowl. The Manningcast was renewed until the 2024 NFL season, and thus returned for 2022.

The January 2nd, 2023 game between the Buffalo Bills and the Cincinnati Bengals was declared a No Contest three days following the injury to Bills safety Damar Hamlin.

2023 NFL season
Monday Night Football will return for 2023.

Team standings (2010–present)
Standings are current as of the 2022 season. 

The postseason games, though covered by the ABC/ESPN Monday Night Football team, are excluded from the standings.

• *St. Louis Rams, 1995–2015

• **San Diego Chargers, 1961–2016

• ***Oakland Raiders, 1995–2019

• **** Washington Redskins, 1937-2019; Washington Football Team, 2020-2021

See also 
Monday Night Football results (1970–1989)
Monday Night Football results (1990–2009)
NBC Sunday Night Football results (2006–present)
Thursday Night Football results (2006–present)

Notes

References

 Total Football II,, Edited by Bob Carroll, Michael Gershman, David Neft and John Thorn,  Harper Collins Publishing, 1999. .

Monday Night Football results
Monday Night Football results
Monday Night Football results
Monday Night Football results
Monday Night Football results
Monday Night Football results
Monday Night Football
National Football League lists
National Football League on television results